Pietro Marino (born 21 November 1986 in Reggio Calabria) is an Italian professional football player who currently plays for ASD Bocale Calcio ADMO

Career
He made his Serie A debut for Reggina Calcio on 31 May 2009 when he started the game against A.C. Siena.

In the 2009/10 Serie B season he became the first-choice goalkeeper for Reggina in December 2009. The first-choice goalkeeper for the first half of the season, Mario Cassano, was on loan from Piacenza Calcio, and that loan ended; the two goalkeepers who were ahead of Marino on the depth chart in the previous, 2008/09 season, Andrea Campagnolo and Christian Puggioni left the team in the off-season.

Now is the first-choice goalkeeper of ASD Bocale Calcio ADMO

References

External links
 

1986 births
Living people
Italian footballers
Italian expatriate footballers
Serie A players
Serie B players
Serie D players
Maltese Premier League players
Reggina 1914 players
A.S.D. Barletta 1922 players
S.S. Monopoli 1966 players
Vigor Lamezia players
Valletta F.C. players
Italian expatriate sportspeople in Malta
Expatriate footballers in Malta
Association football goalkeepers